Hochfelden is a commune in the Bas-Rhin department in Grand Est in north-eastern France. On 1 January 2017, the former commune of Schaffhouse-sur-Zorn was merged into Hochfelden.

History
Until their deportation to the south in 1940, Hochfelden had a significant Jewish community. The town possesses a synagogue, which is also registered as a Monument historique.

In 1941, more than 200 young people celebrated Bastille Day with a street procession. The occupying forces retaliated, placing the village under a state of siege.   The Mayor and Gendarmes were replaced and 106 people, including 23 women, were interned at Schirmeck. The information was reported to London where the events were reported by the BBC.

Economy
Meteor beer is brewed and sold in Hochfelden.

See also
 Communes of the Bas-Rhin department

References

Communes of Bas-Rhin
Bas-Rhin communes articles needing translation from French Wikipedia